The Sohodol is a left tributary of the river Tismana in Romania. It flows into the Tismana in Godinești.

References

Rivers of Romania
Rivers of Gorj County